Italo Alaimo (9 August 1938 – 17 July 1967) was an Italian footballer who played as a right winger.

Following a successful footballing career in several tiers of Italy's league system, Alaimo died on 17 July 1967 during a medical examination as part of his transfer to Serie B club Novara.

Playing career
Following his release from Reggina in 1958 and his consequent success at lower Serie C clubs, Alaimo earned a move to Chieti, making 58 appearances as his club avoided relegation to Serie D for two straight seasons. Nevertheless, Alaimo then dropped down a division anyway to play for Rosignano Solvay, returning to Reggina in November 1963 and earning promotion with his side to Serie B in the 1964–65 season as they won the title.

In July 1967, following several years of success with Reggina, Alaimo earned a move to fellow Serie B side Novara, with the transfer fee amounting to 35 million lire - one of the largest fees in Italian football at the time.

Death
Following his transfer to Novara and his presentation to the club's fans, Alaimo underwent a routine medical examination in order to officially complete the transfer. Alaimo got on an exercise bicycle to undergo a cardiac stress test. He completed his exercise, but as he began to dismount the bicycle, he was struck by a spasm; despite resuscitation attempts, Alaimo passed away. The cause of death was officially given as an electric shock, and three employees at Ospedale Maggiore (where the medical took place) were charged with negligent homicide.

Legacy

Following his death, a street in Reggio di Calabria was named Via Italo Alaimo in his honour.

References

1938 births
1967 deaths
Footballers from Rome
Italian footballers
Reggina 1914 players
S.S. Chieti Calcio players
Novara F.C. players
Serie B players
Serie C players
Serie D players
Association football forwards
20th-century Italian people